The Warrior class consisted of four armoured cruisers built for the Royal Navy in the first decade of the 20th century. After commissioning, all four sister ships were assigned to the Channel and Home Fleets until 1913 when  was transferred to the Mediterranean Fleet. After the start of World War I in August 1914, Warrior participated in the pursuit of the German battlecruiser  and light cruiser  and her three sisters were assigned to the 2nd Cruiser Squadron of the Grand Fleet. Warrior joined the 1st Cruiser Squadron of the Grand Fleet in late 1914. Neither squadron participated in any of the naval battles in the North Sea in 1915.  was destroyed by a magazine explosion in late 1915 and only two of the ships participated in the Battle of Jutland in 1916.  was not engaged during the battle, but Warrior was heavily damaged and sank the following morning.

 was assigned to blockade duty after the battle and sank a German commerce raider in early 1917. Both of the surviving sisters became convoy escorts in 1917 before returning home in 1918. Cochrane supported the Allied intervention in the Russian Civil War in mid-1918. She ran aground in the River Mersey in late 1918 and broke in two. Achilles became a training ship in late 1918 and was sold for scrap in 1921.

Design and description

The four armoured cruisers of the 1903–1904 Naval Programme were originally intended to be repeats of the preceding , but complaints from the fleet that the low placement of the secondary armament of earlier ships of this type meant that the guns could not be fought in anything other than a dead calm sea caused the issue to be reviewed by the Board of Admiralty in late 1903 and early 1904. Based on the Duke of Edinburghs, the Warriors were expected to be lighter, which allowed weight to be used for changing the secondary armament. Officers from the fleet suggested changing the armament to four  guns in single-gun turrets raised to the upper deck. As the ships had only just begun construction, the change would cost a total of £250,000 for all four ships and the Admiralty approved the change on 30 March 1904.

The ships' complement was 770 officers and enlisted men. They were much steadier gun platforms than their predecessors with a metacentric height of  So much so that Achilles and Natal were the best-shooting ships in the fleet in 1907 and 1909 respectively. Very good sea boats, according to naval historian Oscar Parkes, "they gained the reputation of being the best cruisers we (the British) ever built."

Armament
The Warriors' main armament consisted of six 45-calibre BL 9.2-inch Mk X guns in single-gun turrets. The guns were distributed in two centreline turrets, one each fore and one aft of the superstructure, and four wing turrets disposed in the corners about the funnels. The centreline turrets could traverse a total of 285° while the wing turrets were limited to 120° on the broadside due to muzzle blast. The gun had an elevation range of −5° to +15°. The gun's rate of fire was about three rounds per minute and the ships carried 100 rounds for each gun.

Their secondary armament of four 50-calibre BL 7.5-inch Mk II guns was arranged in four turrets amidships. The guns could only traverse about 110° on the broadside. The guns had a rate of fire of about four rounds per minute and each gun was provided with 100 rounds.

Twenty-four Vickers quick-firing (QF) 3-pounder guns were fitted for defence against torpedo boats, six on turret roofs and eighteen in the superstructure, all on pivot mounts. These guns were too small to be useful against the torpedo boats before they got within torpedo range.

The ships also mounted three submerged 18-inch torpedo tubes. They carried a total of eighteen torpedoes in addition to the six  torpedoes that could be used by the two  steam pinnaces.

Armour
The Warrior-class ships had a  waterline armour belt of Krupp cemented armour that covered  of the hull amidships. Transverse bulkheads six inches thick protected the citadel from raking fire.

The faces of the main gun turrets were 7.5 inches thick with  sides and a  roof. The barbettes were protected by six inches of armour as were the ammunition hoists, although the armour for those thinned to three inches between the armour belt.

Modifications
The funnels proved to be too short in service and they were raised around 1912 to keep the superstructure free of smoke in a following wind. A single Hotchkiss QF 6-pounder anti-aircraft gun on a high-angle mounting was mounted on the quarterdeck in 1915. It had a maximum depression of 8° and a maximum elevation of 60°. It was replaced by a QF 3 inch 20 cwt guns on a high-angle mount in 1916. This gun had a maximum depression of 10° and a maximum elevation of 90°. A pair of Vickers QF three-pounders on high-angle mountings were probably installed amidships during 1915–16. They could elevate to +80° and depress to -5°.

The guns on top of Cochranes centreline 9.2-inch turrets were removed in 1915–16. The aftermost 3-pounder guns on the superstructure were removed during 1917 as well as the guns on top of the forward 9.2-inch wing turrets. This reduced her total to twenty 3-pounder guns, excluding the AA guns. Cochranes foremast was converted to a tripod mast to support the weight of a fire-control director in 1917, but the director was not actually fitted until August 1918.

Ships

Service
After completion, the four sisters were assigned to the cruiser squadrons of the Channel and Home Fleets. Natal and Cochrane escorted the royal yacht in 1911–12 for the newly crowned King George V's trip to India to attend the Delhi Durbar and Natal carried the body of the U.S. Ambassador to Great Britain, Whitelaw Reid, back to New York City in December 1912. Warrior was transferred to the 1st Cruiser Squadron of the Mediterranean Fleet in 1913.

At the beginning of World War I, Natal, Achilles and Cochrane were assigned to the 2nd Cruiser Squadron of the Grand Fleet and Warrior was in the Mediterranean. The latter ship was involved in the pursuit of the Goeben and Breslau, but the squadron commander, Rear Admiral Ernest Troubridge, declined to engage the German ships. Warrior remained in the Mediterranean until she was assigned the Grand Fleet in December 1914 and rejoined the 1st Cruiser Squadron. The other three ships remained with the 2nd Cruiser Squadron for most of their careers and did not participate in any of the early naval battles of the war. Natal was sunk by a magazine explosion near Cromarty on 30 December 1915, killing an estimated 390–421 persons on board. Most of her wreck was slowly salvaged over the decades until the remnants were demolished in the 1970s so they were no longer a hazard to navigation.

Achilles was refitting in May 1916 and did not participate in the Battle of Jutland, although both of her surviving sisters did. Warrior was heavily damaged by German capital ships during the battle, losing 71 crewmen killed and 36 wounded. She took on a lot of water and foundered the following morning after her crew was evacuated. The 2nd Cruiser Squadron was not engaged during the battle and did not fire a shot. Achilles was assigned blockade duties in the North Sea after the battle and sank the German raider Leopard in early 1917. Both of the surviving ships were briefly transferred to the North America and West Indies Station in late 1917 for convoy escort duties before returning home in early 1918. Achilles began a lengthy refit in February 1918 while Cochrane was based in Murmansk in mid-1918 during the Allied intervention in the Russian Civil War. She became stranded in the Mersey on 14 November 1918 and broke in two. The wreck was broken up in place by June 1919. Achilles, the last surviving sister, became a training ship in late 1918 and was sold for scrap in May 1921.

Notes

References

Bibliography

External links
 The Dreadnought Project Technical details of the Warrior class.

Cruiser classes
Ship classes of the Royal Navy